Penguin is the seventh studio album by British-American rock band Fleetwood Mac, released in March 1973. It was the first Fleetwood Mac album after the departure of Danny Kirwan, the first to feature Bob Weston and the only one to feature Dave Walker.

The penguin is the band mascot favoured by John McVie. His fascination with the birds originated when he lived near London Zoo during the early days of his marriage to Christine McVie. He was a member of the Zoological Society and would spend hours at the zoo studying and watching the penguins.

Background
After Kirwan was fired following an altercation with the other band members during the Bare Trees tour, the band added guitarist Bob Weston and vocalist Dave Walker (formerly of Savoy Brown and The Idle Race) in September 1972. Weston was well known for playing slide guitar and had known the band from his touring period with Long John Baldry. Fleetwood Mac also hired Savoy Brown's road manager, John Courage. Rather than recording Penguin in a London studio, they hired the Rolling Stones Mobile Studio and brought it to Hampshire in order to record their next album within the domestic atmosphere of Benifold, their communal house. The album was subsequently mixed at AIR Studios in London.

The album's artwork was painted by Chris Moore and the gatefold photo was shot on location at Ludshott Common and Waggoners Wells in Hampshire, according to Dave Walker in an online Q&A interview. For the first time on a Fleetwood Mac album, Mick Fleetwood was credited in the album's liner notes with playing both drums and percussion, even though he did both on previous albums, although uncredited.

The subsequent tour seemed to go well, and Penguin was the highest charting Fleetwood Mac album in the US at the time, clawing its way into the Top 50. However, during the recording of their next album, Mystery to Me, it was mutually agreed upon that Walker's vocal style and attitude "did not fit in" with Fleetwood Mac and by June 1973 he had left. If anything was ever recorded by Walker for Mystery to Me it was not used.

Walker was featured on only two tracks on Penguin in the end, namely his own composition "The Derelict" and a cover of Junior Walker's hit "(I'm a) Road Runner" on which he also played harmonica solos.

Track notes
 "Remember Me" was performed live by Christine McVie at Bob Welch's Roxy concert in 1981. This version appeared on the 2004 CD Live from the Roxy.
 "Revelation" was re-recorded by Bob Welch for His Fleetwood Mac Years & Beyond in 2003.
 "Did You Ever Love Me" was released as a single but did not chart.
 "Night Watch" features a brief guitar contribution from Fleetwood Mac's founder Peter Green at the end.
 "Caught in the Rain", an instrumental, was the only track on a Fleetwood Mac record where Bob Weston received the sole writing credit.

Track listing

Personnel
Fleetwood Mac
Bob Welch – guitar, vocals, bass guitar on track 6
Bob Weston – lead guitar, slide guitar on track 1, banjo and harmonica on track 5, harmony vocals on track 7
Christine McVie – keyboards, vocals
Dave Walker – vocals on tracks 4 and 5, harmonica on track 4
John McVie – bass guitar
Mick Fleetwood – drums, percussion

Additional personnel
Steve Nye – organ on track 8
Ralph Richardson – steel drums on track 7
Russell Valdez – steel drums on track 7
Fred Totesant – steel drums on track 7
Peter Green – additional lead guitar on track 8

Production
Producer: Fleetwood Mac and Martin Birch
Engineer: Martin Birch
Sleeve design: Modula / John Watkins (front cover) / Chris Moore
Inside photo by Barry Wentzell
Recorded in Hampshire on Rolling Stones Mobile Studio
Mixed at AIR Studios, London

Charts

References

Fleetwood Mac albums
1973 albums
Albums produced by Martin Birch
Reprise Records albums
Albums produced by John McVie
Albums produced by Mick Fleetwood
Albums produced by Christine McVie
Albums produced by Bob Welch (musician)
Albums recorded in a home studio
Albums recorded at AIR Studios